Benghazi (lit. Son of [the] Ghazi) is the second-most populous city in Libya as well as the largest city in Cyrenaica, with an estimated population of 1,207,250 in 2020. Located on the Gulf of Sidra in the Mediterranean, Benghazi is also a major seaport. 

A Greek colony named Euesperides had existed in the area from around 525 BC. In the 3rd century BC, it was relocated and refounded as the Ptolemaic city of Berenice. Berenice prospered under the Romans, and after the 3rd century AD it superseded Cyrene and Barca as the centre of Cyrenaica. The city went into decline during the Byzantine period and had already been reduced to a small town before its conquest by the Arabs. In 1911, Italy captured Benghazi and the rest of Tripolitania from the Ottomans. Under Italian rule, Benghazi witnessed a period of extensive development and modernization, particularly in the second half of the 1930s. The city changed hands several times during World War II and was heavily damaged in the process. After the war Benghazi was rebuilt and became the co-capital of the newly independent Kingdom of Libya. Following the 1969 coup d'état by Muammar Gaddafi, Benghazi lost its capital status and all government offices relocated to Tripoli.

On 15 February 2011, an uprising against the government of Muammar Gaddafi occurred in the city. The revolts spread by 17 February to Bayda, Tobruk, Ajdabya, Al Marj in the East and Zintan, Zawiya in the West, calling for the end of the Gaddafi Regime. Benghazi was taken by Gaddafi opponents on 21 February, who founded the National Transitional Council. On 19 March 2011, the city was the site of the turning point of the Libyan Civil War, when the Libyan Army attempted to score a decisive victory against the NTC by attacking Benghazi, but was forced back by local resistance and intervention from the French Air Force authorized by UNSC Resolution 1973 to protect civilians, allowing the rebellion to continue.

Benghazi remains a centre of Libyan commerce, industry, transport and culture. It continues to hold institutions and organizations normally associated with a capital city, including several national government buildings as well as the National Library of Libya.

History

Ancient Greek colony 

The ancient Greek city that existed within the modern day boundaries of Benghazi was founded around 525 BC; at the time, it was called Euesperides and Hesperis.
Euesperides was most likely founded by people from Cyrene or Barce, which was located on the edge of a lagoon which opened from the sea. At the time, this area may have been deep enough to receive small sailing vessels. The name was attributed to the fertility of the neighborhood, which gave rise to the mythological associations of the garden of the Hesperides. The ancient city existed on a raised piece of land opposite of what is now the Sidi-Abayd graveyard in the Northern Benghazi suburb of Sbikhat al-Salmani (al-Salmani Marsh).

The city is first mentioned by ancient sources in Herodotus' account of the revolt of Barca and the Persian expedition to Cyrenaica in c. 515 BC, where it is stated that the punitive force sent by the satrap of Egypt conquered Cyrenaica as far west as Euesperides. The oldest coins minted in the city date back to 480 BC. One side of those coins has an engraving of Delphi. The other side is an engraving of a silphium plant, once the symbol of trade from Cyrenaica because of its use as a rich seasoning and as a medicine. The coinage suggests that the city must have enjoyed some autonomy from Cyrene in the early 5th century BC, when the issues of Euesperides had their own types with the legend EU (ES), distinct from those of Cyrene.

The city was in hostile territory and was surrounded by inhospitable tribes. The Greek historian Thucydides mentions a siege of the city in 414 BC, by Libyans who were probably the Nasamones: Euesperides was saved by the unexpected arrival of the Spartan general Gylippus and his fleet, who were blown to Libya by contrary winds on their way to Sicily.

One of the Cyrenean kings whose fate is connected with the city is Arcesilaus IV. The king used his chariot victory at the Pythian Games of 462 BC to attract new settlers to Euesperides, where Arcesilaus hoped to create a safe refuge for himself against the resentment of the people of Cyrene. This proved ineffective, since when the king fled to Euesperides during the anticipated revolution (around 440 BC), he was assassinated, thus terminating the almost 200-year rule of the Battiad dynasty.

An inscription found there and dated around the middle of the 4th century BC states that the city had a constitution similar to that of Cyrene, with a board of chief magistrates (ephors) and a council of elders (gerontes). Later in the 4th century BC, during the unsettled period which followed Alexander's death, the city backed the losing side in a revolt by the Spartan adventurer Thibron; trying to create an empire for himself, he was defeated by the Cyreneans and their allies.

After the marriage around the middle of the 3rd century BC of Ptolemy III to Berenice, daughter of the Cyrenean Governor Magas, many Cyrenaican cities were renamed to mark the occasion. Euesperides became Berenice and the change of name also involved a relocation. Its desertion was probably due to the silting up of the lagoons; Berenice, the place they moved to, lies underneath Benghazi's modern city centre. The Greek colony had lasted from the 6th to the mid-3rd centuries BC.

Romans and Christianity
Modern Benghazi, on the Gulf of Sidra, lies a little southwest of the site of the ancient Greek city of Berenice or Berenicis or Bernici. That city was traditionally founded in 446 BC (different sources give different dates like 347 BC or 249 BC), by a brother of the king of Cyrene, but got the name Berenice only when it was refounded in the 3rd century BC under the patronage of Berenice (Berenike), the daughter of Magas, king of Cyrene, and wife of Ptolemy III Euergetes, the ruler of Egypt. The new city was later given the name Hesperides, in reference to the Hesperides, the guardians of the mythic western paradise. The name may have also referred to green oases in low-lying areas in the nearby coastal plain.

Benghazi later became a Roman city and greatly prospered for 600 years. The city superseded Cyrene and Barca as the chief center of Cyrenaica after the 3rd century AD and during the Persian attacks; in 642–643 -when was conquered by the Arabs and partially destroyed- it had dwindled to an insignificant village among magnificent historic ruins.

In its more prosperous period, Berenice became a Christian bishopric. The first of its bishops whose name is recorded in extant documents is Ammon, to whom Dionysius of Alexandria wrote in about 260. Dathes was at the First Council of Nicaea in 325, and Probatius at a synod held in Constantinople in 394. No longer a residential bishopric, Berenice is today listed by the Catholic Church as a titular see.

Ottoman province 
In the 13th century, the small settlement became an important player in the trade growing up between Genoese merchants and the tribes of the hinterland. In 16th century maps, the name of Marsa ibn Ghazi appears.

Benghazi had a strategic port location, one that was too useful to be ignored by the Ottomans.
In 1578, the Turks conquered Benghazi and it was ruled from Tripoli by the Karamanlis from 1711 to 1835; it then passed under direct Ottoman rule until 1911. Greek and Italian sponge fishermen worked its coastal waters. In 1858, and again in 1874, Benghazi was devastated by bubonic plague.

Italian colonial rule 

In 1911, Benghazi was invaded and conquered by the Italians. Nearly half the local population of Cyrenaica under the leadership of Omar Mukhtar resisted the Italian occupation.

In the early 1930s, the revolt was over and the Italians—under governor Italo Balbo—started attempts to assimilate the local population with pacifying policies: a number of new villages for Cyrenaicans were created with health services and schools.

Additionally Cyrenaica was populated by more than 20,000 Italian colonists in the late 1930s, mainly around the coast of Benghazi. Benghazi population was made up of more than 35 per cent of Italians in 1939.
As a consequence, there was in Cyrenaica and mostly in Benghazi a huge economic development in the second half of the 1930s. Benghazi grew to be a modern city with a new airport, new railway station, new seaplane station, an enlarged port and many facilities. Benghazi was going to be connected in 1940 by a new railway to Tripoli, but in summer of that year war started between Italians and British and infrastructure development came to a standstill.

World War II 
In World War II Benghazi changed hands several times. During Operation Compass the city was captured from the Italians by Combe Force on 6 February 1941.

Benghazi was recaptured by Axis powers, led by general Erwin Rommel of the German Africa Corps, on 4 April.

It was taken again during Operation Crusader by the British on 24 December only to change hands again on 29 January 1942 in the Rommel Afrika Corps' push to Egypt.

During the fateful Battle of El Alamein– from Alexandria, Egypt–British troops led by general Bernard Montgomery again defeated the Afrika Corps which then made a long steady retreat westward passing through Benghazi for the final time. On 20 November, Benghazi was captured by the British Eighth Army and thereafter held by the British.

In August 1943 from Benina airport of Benghazi started the US attack on the Ploiești oil refineries with 178 B-24 bombers (called Operation Tidal Wave), after an Italian "Arditi" paratroopers attack that destroyed some Allied aircraft in June 1943.

Contemporary Benghazi 

Heavily bombed in World War II, Benghazi was later rebuilt with the country's newly found oil wealth as a gleaming showpiece of modern Libya. It became the capital city of Emirate of Cyrenaica (1949–1951) under Idris Senussi I. In 1951, Cyrenaica was merged with Tripolitania and Fezzan to form the independent Kingdom of Libya, of which both Benghazi and Tripoli were capital cities. 
Benghazi lost its capital status when the Free Officers under the leadership of Muammar Gaddafi staged a coup d'état in 1969, whereafter all government institutions were concentrated in Tripoli, Even though King Idris was forced into exile and the monarchy abolished, support for the Senussi dynasty remained strong in Cyrenaica. This was emphasized by real or perceived injustices from the government towards the people of Benghazi, including the demolition in the year 2000 of the arena of football club Alahly Benghazi S.C., following anti-government protests.
On 15 April 1986, U.S. Air Force and Navy planes bombed Benghazi and Tripoli. President Ronald Reagan justified the attacks by claiming Libya was responsible for terrorism directed at the United States, including the bombing of La Belle discothèque in West Berlin ten days before.

2011 Revolution 

In February 2011, peaceful protests erupted in Benghazi that were brutally suppressed by Gaddafi's armed forces and loyalists. The violence urged the people to fight back and try to overthrow Gaddafi from power in The Libyan Revolution. At least 500 people were killed in the protests against the government.

The former Libyan flag used in the Kingdom of Libya was used by many protesters as an opposition flag. Demonstrators were also seen carrying images of King Idris I. Benghazi and the Cyrenaica have been traditional strongholds of the royal Senussi dynasty.

As of 21 February, the city was reported to be largely controlled by the opposition. The widely loathed mayor, Huda Ben Amer, nicknamed "the Executioner", fled the city for Tripoli. Residents organised to direct traffic and collect refuse. By 24 February, a committee made up of lawyers, judges and respected local people had been formed in order to provide civic administration and public services within the city.  Two local radio stations, operated by Voice of Free Libya, along with a newspaper, were also established.

From 26 February to 26 August, Benghazi was the temporary headquarters of the National Transitional Council which is led by the former justice minister, Mustafa Abdul Jalil, until Tripoli was liberated.

On 19 March, pro-Gaddafi forces almost defeated the rebellion when they began attacking the city of Benghazi in a major offensive, but were forced back the next day when NATO forces began implementing United Nations Security Council Resolution 1973.

On 1 June, explosives were detonated in a car near the Tibesti Hotel, with a rebel spokesman calling the bombing a "cowardly act". It was suspected that an officer was killed, and many people started to shout out anti-Gaddafi chants while the Tibesti was cordoned off.

On 19 May 2012, residents of Benghazi voted in historic local elections; this was the first time such elections have been held in the city since the 1960s, and turnout was high.

2012 attack on U.S. diplomatic mission 

On 11 September 2012, the U.S. diplomatic mission in Benghazi was attacked by a heavily armed group of 125–150 gunmen, whose trucks bore the logo of Ansar al-Sharia, a group of Islamist militants, also known as Al Qaeda in the Arabian Peninsula, working with the local government to manage security in Benghazi. U.S. Ambassador J. Christopher Stevens, Foreign Service Information Management Officer (IMO) Sean Smith, and CIA contractors and former Navy SEALs Tyrone S. Woods and Glen Doherty were killed during a series of raids, commencing at nightfall and continuing into the next morning.  Ten others were injured.

Second Libyan Civil War 

Following the outbreak of the second Libyan Civil War in 2014, Benghazi became the subject of heavy fighting between the Libyan National Army-aligned House of Representatives government, and the Islamist Shura Council of Benghazi Revolutionaries and ISIL-aligned Wilayat Barqa, which were entrenched in various pockets in the city. During the closing months of the battle, between late-2016 and mid-2017, much of the urban center in and around the remaining Shura Council pocket in the central coastal quarters of Suq Al-Hout and al-Sabri suffered heavy bombardment and war damage. Wilayat Barqa militants reportedly fled Benghazi in early January, while the LNA's General Khalifa Haftar declared the city cleared of the Shura Council on 5 July 2017. Despite Haftar's declaration of the liberation of the city, dozens of gunmen remained fortified and besieged in Sidi Akribesh, according to sources close to military. LNA captured the last militant-held district in December 2017.

Administrative divisions 

Benghazi is one of Libya's 22 shabiyahs (people's districts). Benghazi Baladiyat is divided into 32 Basic People's Congress administrative divisions, in which the responsibilities of the corresponding political units of the same name fall.
The official 32 Basic People's Congresses of Benghazi are:

Population

Demographics 

As with other cities in Libya, there is a reasonable amount of ethnic diversity in Benghazi. The people of eastern Libya, Benghazi included, have in the past always been of predominantly Arab descent. In recent times, however, there has been an influx of African immigrants into Benghazi. There are also many Egyptian immigrants in Benghazi. A small Greek community also exists in Benghazi. The Greek island of Crete is a short distance from Benghazi, and many families in Benghazi today bear Cretan surnames. There are even a few Italian-related families, left from the colonial times before World War II.

The overwhelming majority of Libyans in Benghazi were of Berber descent until the arrival of Bani Salim (Arabic tribe). In the 11th century, the Sa'adi tribes from the Banu Sulyam migrated to Cyrenaica; each sub-tribe from the Sa'adi historically controlled a section of Cyrenaica. Benghazi and its surrounding areas were controlled by Barghathi tribe. In modern times, Benghazi has seen a lot of Libyans from different parts of the country move into the city, especially since the Kingdom era. Many came to Benghazi from Misrata. Thus Benghazi has always been seen as a welcoming city, a city which the local Bedouins refer to as '' which can be translated as, 'Benghazi raises the lost', as many immigrants who arrived from the Western Maghreb or the former Al Andalus came with little money, clothes or food and were looked after very generously by the local Bedouin population as well as those arriving following the Italian war from western Libya.

Religion 

The predominant religion in Benghazi is Islam. Practically all of the city's inhabitants are Sunni Muslims. During Islamic holidays such as Ramadan, most abstain from food; restaurants are usually empty during the day, with the exception of some expatriates and tourists. Alcohol is banned by law in Benghazi and throughout Libya in accordance with Islamic principles. The conservative Islamic nature of Benghazi creates a strong sense of family life in the city –  practically all teenagers and young adults live at home until they get married. Many Muslims in Benghazi adhere to the traditional Maliki school of religious law, however much less so than in decades past. In recent years, more people are beginning to practice Salafism with the spread of literalist inclined Islamic television channels. It is not uncommon therefore to see woman wearing black niqabs and men with full beards in Benghazi because of the existence of such schools, although not exclusively for that purpose. The Senussi order from which the royal dynasty sprang has traditionally enjoyed strong support in Benghazi and the Cyrenaica.

For Muslims, there are many mosques throughout Benghazi; the oldest and best known such as the Atiq and Osman mosques are located in and around the medina.

There is also a small Christian community in the city. The Roman Catholic Apostolic Vicariate of Benghazi's Franciscan Church of the Immaculate Conception serves Benghazi's Latin Catholic community of roughly 4,000; there is also a decommissioned cathedral church (1929–1939; closed 1977; currently abandoned). For Egyptian Copts, there is a Coptic Orthodox church (which was formerly the grand synagogue) with two serving priests.

Jews lived in Benghazi, as they did elsewhere in Libya, from Roman times until 1967 when most were airlifted out after a series of riots in the years after the 1948 Arab–Israeli War. There are no Jews remaining in Libya today.

Education 

The oldest university in Libya is the University of Libya, founded by royal decree in 1955. It was initially housed in the royal Al Manar Palace before receiving its own campus in 1968. It was later split and became known as University of Benghazi. There are some private universities such as Libyan International Medical University.

Education in Benghazi, as throughout Libya, is compulsory and paid entirely by taxpayers. Compulsory education continues until ninth grade. There are many public primary and secondary schools scattered throughout the city, as well as some private schools.

University education is also paid entirely by taxpayers for all Libyan citizens in Benghazi. There are many other foreign schools such as Benghazi European School and private schools.

The country's largest library, containing over 300,000 volumes, is affiliated with the university.

International schools include:
 International School Benghazi
 Benghazi European School
 British School in Benghazi

Geography 

Benghazi is one of the sub-regions of the area referred to as Cyrenaica, the others being the Jebel Akhdar and the coastal plain running east of Apollonia.

Benghazi is surrounded by the "barr", arid steppe. The Jebel Akhdar, literally, "the Green Mountain", just north of Benghazi, rises to the east. Here the vegetation and climate is more Mediterranean in feel with none of the desert landscapes found further south. A large section of the western Jebel Akhdar is taken up by the fertile Marj plain. Annual rainfall here, especially around Cyrene, can reach . It was this fertile site northeast of Benghazi that the Greeks chose for their settlement. The soil in Benghazi is a rich red colour and very clayey. Sirocco winds are not uncommon in the city, and as such, many of Benghazi's smaller streets and buildings can be quite dusty.

To the north, below the steep cliffs of the plateau, lies a narrow belt of Mediterranean farmland. Olives and other Mediterranean fruits and vegetables are grown here. To the south, the forest and farmland gives way to juniper bush maquis and pre-desert scrub with some winter grazing.

As a district, Benghazi borders Hizam Al Akhdar, which surrounds it on land.

Natural recreation and parks 

Although Benghazi does not have a high percentage of green space per resident, there are a few public parks and green recreational areas in the city. Perhaps the most famous is the zoological garden and theme park in Al-Fuwayhat also known as Benghazi Zoo; the park is referred to locally as al-Bosco, an Italian name for wood (as in "Belleau Wood", not as in "wood plank"). The park is a combination of a zoo with trees planted during Italian rule and which contains wild cats, primates, elephants, birds and other animals, and a small theme park containing electrical rides, added later in the 1980s as part of a redevelopment of the entire site. It is one of the most popular parks in Benghazi, and is very busy on public holidays, as well as amongst school children and scouts on outings.

On Gamal Abdel Nasser Street is 23 July Park, another large green space which faces the Tibesti Hotel and borders the waterfront. The park is popular amongst teenagers, and families on Thursday nights (as Friday is a day off work throughout Libya). Another large and popular park is al-Buduzira in North Benghazi on the al-'Uruba Road in al-Kwayfiya. The park surrounds a natural lake, and is more rugged in nature than the city parks. A section of al-Buduzira is also a water park with large slides, whilst the southern part of the park has picnic areas which are popular in the summers.

Climate 
Benghazi has a warm semi-arid climate (Köppen climate classification BSh) with hot and dry, prolonged summers and mild to cool, slightly wet winters. In the north of the city lies the Mediterranean-climate 'Jabal Al-Akhdar' (Green Mountains), and in the south the climate is becoming desert-like. Summers in Benghazi are hot and rainless, but with high levels of humidity. Winters are mild with occasional rain. The city's local water supply is supplemented by groundwater transported from the aquifers of southern Libya along the Great Manmade River.

Economy 

Benghazi, as the principal city of eastern Libya, is one of Libya's major economic centres. The city has an important port which is vital to the economy, as Libya imports many foodstuffs and manufactured products. Benghazi is also an industrial and commercial centre in Libya. Major manufactured goods include processed food, textiles, tanning, processed salt and construction materials, particularly cement; a large cement factory is located in al-Hawari. Food processing is based on local fish, imported goods, and the produce of irrigated coastal lowlands and the nearby Jabal al-Akdhar Mountains, including cereal, dates, olives, wool and meat.

Finance is also important to the city's economy, with the Libyan Bank of Commerce and Development maintaining branches in Benghazi; the Bank's headquarters is a high office tower on Gamal Abdel Nasser Street in el-Berka. Other large banks include the Central Bank of Libya office in the city centre.

The oil industry drives the city's commerce. Large national companies such as the Al-Brega Oil Marketing Company and the Arabian Gulf Oil Company are important to the city's economy and employ many people. An increase in consumer prices has been coupled with an increase in the importance of the retail sector to the city's economy. In recent years, international franchises such as United Colors of Benetton, H&M and Nike have opened in Benghazi.

Tourism is still in its very early stages in Libya. The industry is however growing in importance in Benghazi. The majority of tourists that visit Eastern Libya use Benghazi as a base for which to explore the Greek ruins in Cyrene or to make desert excursions south in Kufra. The two main hotels in the city are the Tibesti Hotel and Uzu Hotel, and several other hotels have opened in recent years to cater for increased demand. Handicrafts are found in the many souks in the city, but are of little significance to the economy.

Skanska built a good connection of speedways and flyovers in the decades after the Libyan revolution in 1969; this has made the transport of goods between Benghazi and other cities easier. Benghazi's air transport uses Benina International Airport; numerous daily flights leave for Tripoli and connections are also available to other African, Asian and European cities.

In April 2012, the Libyan economy ministry announced plans for creating a free trade area in Benghazi.

Transport 

Benghazi is a transport hub in Eastern Libya and is an important city on the northern coastal road that crosses the country. An efficiently designed system of roads, bridges and underpasses cover Benghazi, however traffic jams and poorly maintained streets are not uncommon. A microbus system covers many areas of the city and has its base in Al-Funduq. National and international bus services also leave from Al-Fudnuq from the central bus station. , earthworks were underway in the city for a rail network which will traverse northern Libya.

Benina International Airport serves national and international flights.

The Benghazi port is a vital terminal for the region, and allows for the import and export of national and international goods and food products.

The city's road network is generally well designed. An efficient system of highways, flyovers, ringroads and underpasses serve the city, and allow for the transport of goods and vehicles. The roads are not always well-maintained however, and often have incorrect, poorly visible or no road markings, as well as potholes in some roads and inner-city streets. In recent years, a rapid increase in car ownership has meant that traffic jams, lack of parking spaces and overcrowding are also not uncommon, especially on smaller streets. Road accidents are also on the rise because of the increase in vehicles and the subsequent lax in attention given by authorities to dangerous driving. In a rare RTA conflict health study, road traffic accidents were studied during the period of the 2011 armed conflict, in which Benghazi was a focal point of events. It was found that while the number of road traffic accidents had decreased during the period of the war, the morbidity and mortality of the injured had increased significantly.

There is no systemised public transport system in Benghazi despite the city's size and significance. A popular system of microbuses has developed in recent years; bus journeys run on fixed routes and passengers can embark and disembark anywhere on the route. Most microbuses stop at Al-Funduq or have the end of Souq Al-Jarid in Al-Funduq as their final destination. National and international coach services depart and arrive at Benghazi's coach station at Al-Funduq with regular journeys to Tripoli, as well as international services to Cairo, Amman and Damascus.

Until the 1960s there were two small railways, built by the Italians, departing from Benghazi and served with classical Littorine: Benghazi-Barce and Benghazi-Soluch. But recently huge railway plans were supported by Gaddafi: work started in September 2008 on a new railway network that would connect to major cities of western Libya at Sirte. Russian Railways is responsible for the three-year contract. In the future, a rail link may be built to both Tunisia and Egypt forming a North African coastal rail network.

Cityscape 

The city is divided into many neighbourhoods, some of which were founded during Italian Colonial rule and many which have developed as a result of modern urban sprawl. The different neighbourhoods vary in their levels of economic prosperity, as well as their cultural, historic and social atmosphere. Generally, the city is roughly divided into the following areas: Central Benghazi (colloquially referred to as al-Blaad by locals) – includes the medina, and the old quarter, Central Districts which circle the downtown – Al-Sabri, Sidi Abayd, Sidi Hsayn, Al-Berka, Al-Salmani, Al-Hadaa'ik, Al-Fuwayhat and Al-Keesh, Central Suburbs – Al-Laythi, Bu Atni, Al-Quwarsha, Al-Hawari, Coastal Districts – Al-Kwayfiya (North), Garyounis, Bu-Fakhra and Jarrutha (South), and the Distant Suburbs – Gimeenis, Benina and Sidi Khalifa.

Central Benghazi is where the majority of Benghazi's historical monuments are located, and has the city's most popular tourist attractions. Virtually all of Benghazi's theatres, libraries, best clothing stores, markets and old mosques can be found there. The Italian quarter is also located in the centre. The central districts are mostly residential and commercial areas such as Sidi Hsayn. The central suburbs are almost entirely residential and more like little towns in their own right; Al-Quwarsha is a good example of this. The coastal districts (especially the southern districts) are where Benghazi's beaches can be found. Some sections have become more popular as residential areas in recent years (such as Qanfuda). These areas are still primarily recreational however, and many beach condominium resorts (known locally as chalets) have been built in previous years such as those at al-Nakheel beach, and the Nayrouz condominiums.

Culture 

Benghazi is one of the cultural centres of Libya and is a base for tourists, visitors and academics in the region. Throughout its history, Benghazi has developed with a certain level of independence from the more Maghreb oriented capital Tripoli. This has influenced the city, and as such, the cultural atmosphere in Benghazi is more Arab in nature than that in Tripoli. An influx immigrants including Egyptian, Iraqi, Palestinian, Sudanese and Syrian immigrants have also influenced the city's culture to a certain extent in recent years.

The city centre contains a few local theatres, as well as the Dar al-Kutub National Library in Al-Funduq, where the works of popular local novelists like Sadeq Naihoum and Khalifa al-Fakhri can be found. Different architectural styles attest to the different empires that have controlled the city throughout history. Sport is also important in the city; two of Libya's most successful football clubs are based in Benghazi.

Architecture 
There is a variety of architectural styles in Benghazi, which reflect the number of times the city has changed hands throughout its history. Arab, Ottoman and Italian rule have influenced the different streetscapes, buildings and quarters in Benghazi.

Ancient architectural remains of the Greek and later Roman settlement of Berenice can be found by the Italian lighthouse. There is a trace of the 3rd century BC wall built by the Greeks, four Roman peristyle houses, six wine vats. A Byzantine church also exists on the site, with a mosaic still intact. These ruins formed the northern part of the ancient city, which extended south and east but now lies buried beneath the modern city.

The next oldest section of the city is the Medina quarter, which began to grow sometime under Medieval Arab rule, and is still intact today. This quarter stretches out from the Northern shores of the harbour, and covers an area roughly bounded by Ahmed Rafiq al-Mahdawi Street to the North-west, al-Jezayir Street to the South-east and 23 July Street to the South-west. The heart of the medina is Maydan al-Hurriya (Freedom Square); to the northeast of this is the covered Souq al-Jareed.

The largest Ottoman architectural monument in Benghazi is the late 19th-century Ottoman palace in El-Berka; built during the rule of Rashid Pasha II. The front elevation was completed in 1895, whilst the side sections were added later during Italian rule. The white and green structure houses 360 rooms; and is on a tract of land where Gamal Abdel Nasser Street meets al-Saqzali Street; south of the 28 March football stadium.

The house of Omar Pasha Mansour El Kikhia, an Ottoman Pasha from a prominent Benghazi family, represents a good example of Ottoman residential architecture with several balconies, stone archways, and an open courtyard containing a fountain. The home was recently restored, remodeled and converted into the Bait-al Medina al-Thaqafi museum.

Benghazi came under Italian rule in the early part of the 20th century. Some examples of Italianate, as well as modernist colonial architecture from this period remain today. Under the governorships of Generals Ernesto Mombelli and Attilio Teruzzi in the 1920s, the buildings commissioned in Benghazi had an eclectic architectural language that embodied a Western conception of Eastern architecture. An example of this is the Municipal palace built in 1924, which stands in Maydan al-Hurriya (Freedom Square). The building combines Moorish arches with Italianate motifs on the façade. Italians even did the first architectural plan of Benghazi. in the 1930s, with a new railway station and promenade.

The largest colonial building from this Italian period is the Benghazi Cathedral in Maydan El Catedraeya (Cathedral Square), which was built in the 1920s and has two large distinct domes.

Benghazi was heavily bombed during World War II, and so the majority of buildings in the city are examples of modern or contemporary architecture. The central business district was built mostly in the 1960s and 1970s with Libya's newfound oil wealth. The highest building in Benghazi is the Tibesti Hotel on Gamal Abdel Nasser Street built in 1989. Another prominent example of modern architecture in Benghazi is the Da'wah al-Islamiyah Building, which has a series of distinctive cubes piled in the shape of a pyramid.

Important colonial buildings designed during Italian rule include the Berenice Cinema (currently under renovation) which was designed Marcello Piacentini and Luigi Piccinato in 1928.

Sports 
Benghazi is the second largest city in Libya, and as such, has some of the best sports facilities in the country. The city has various sporting centres of different standards, such as football stadia, beach clubs (where many water sports are played), as well as several other public and private facilities. Benghazi has hosted many national sports events throughout the years, as well as more significant international competitions such as the African Cup of Nations.

Football is the most-popular sport in Benghazi, and two of Libya's most-successful football clubs, Al-Ahly Benghazi and Al-Nasr Benghazi, are based in the city. The two teams have won the Libyan Premier League five times; Al Ahly four and Al Nasr only one. The most-important football event that took place in Benghazi was the 1982 African Cup of Nations. The city hosted six group games and a semifinal in the March 28 Stadium, Libya's second-largest stadium. The city will very likely be the scene of more games when Libya re-hosts the African Cup of Nations in 2013.

The largest sporting centre in Benghazi is the Medina al-Riyadhia (Sports City). The complex is situated just south of the city centre, and houses the 28 March Stadium, and the Slayman al Tharrat basketball stadium – several matches of the 2009 FIBA Africa Championship were hosted at the arena. The complex also has a sports hall for indoor sports, a tennis stadium and several small tennis courts. The facility was built in the 1950s and is therefore quite outdated; the stadia have nonetheless undergone maintenance work in recent years. Sports City was recently closed down for a complete redevelopment of the site. , the 28 March Stadium was undergoing demolition work, and a new 45,000 all seater stadium was to be constructed in its place. A second smaller stadium was to be built on-site, and the entire site was to undergo redevelopment before its reopening in 2011, and its use in the 2013 African Nations Cup.

The Eastern suburb of Sidi Khalifa accommodates an equestrian sports facility. The 'Martyrs of Benghazi's Riding Club' boasts a number of female members who, at least until 2016, engaged in sportive competition.

Benghazi is a coastal city, and its beaches are an important location for sporting activities. The coast at Jeliana is home to the Milaha Beach Club amongst others. Wind surfing and swimming are two of the most popular water sports. There are also several contact sport clubs in the city –judo and taekwondo are popular men's sports in Benghazi. In recent times, rugby sevens has seen great success with three clubs in the vicinity.  Gyms have also become more popular in the city in recent years, because of a greater concern for healthy living amongst Libyans.

Food 
Food and drink is very important to the culture of the people of Benghazi, as it is in the rest of Libya. Many of the dishes and ingredients used are passed down as tradition from generation to generation. The main ingredients that are used in their cuisine are olive oil, garlic, palm dates, grains, and milk. These products are natural to this area, and these ingredients are very common to much of North Africa and the Mediterranean. Another tradition of Libyan culinary culture is tea. Tea from Benghazi has a uniquely thick, bitter taste. Tea drinking is a social activity that close friends and relatives usually take part in.

Benghazi is home to many distinctive dishes that can be prepared at home. Bazin is one of the most well known of these dishes. Bazin is a dish consisting of a small loaf of heated dough and a meat or vegetable sauce. The dough can be ripped into bite-sized pieces and dipped into the sauce. This dish uses essential ingredients such as garlic and oil. One common dessert that can be found in Benghazi is deep fried dates. These are often served with milk.

Notable people
Notable people from Benghazi include:
 Khadījah Jahamī, broadcaster
 Fadwa El Gallal, journalist
 Taha El Sherif Ben Amer, Minister of Transport of Libya
 Amal Bayou, microbiologist and politician

See also 

 List of cities in Libya
 2012 Benghazi attack
 HIV trial in Libya
 Notes from Hell

References

External links 

 Zum.de's History of Cyrenaica
 Google
 University of Benghazi
 Libyan International Medical University
 GCatholic – former cathedral
 Libya lifts 'HIV medics' sentence, but then Libya to execute 'HIV medics'
 Lexicorient.com's article on Benghazi
 Photos of Italian Benghazi

Maps showing Benghazi.
 UPI Archives – Airstrike against Libya

 
525 BC
Ancient Greek archaeological sites in Libya
Ancient Greek geography of North Africa
+
Districts of Libya
Port cities and towns in Libya
Populated places established in the 6th century BC
Populated places in Benghazi District
Greek colonies in Libya
6th-century BC establishments
Baladiyat of Libya